In the Mahabharata, Kinnara Kingdom is referred to the territory of a tribe called Kinnaras. The Kinnaras, along with other exotic tribes, were inhabitants of the Himalaya mountains. In the epic Mahabharata the Kinnaras are described as half-man and half-horse beings, living at Mount Mandara.

See also 
Kingdoms of Ancient India

References

Further reading 
Mahabharata of Krishna Dwaipayana Vyasa, translated to English by Kisari Mohan Ganguli
Kingdoms in the Mahabharata
Himalayan kingdoms (Puranas)